String Quartets 2, 3 & 4/If & Why is an album by Simon Haram, The Lyric Quartet, and members of The Michael Nyman Band, featuring music by Michael Nyman.  "If" and "Why" are songs written for The Diary of Anne Frank, where they were performed by Hilary Summers and the Michael Nyman Band.  Here, the melody lines are taken by Simon Haram's alto saxophone.

Track listing
 String Quartet No. 2
 String Quartet No. 3
 Miserere Paraphrase, for violin & piano
 In Re Don Giovanni, for band
 String Quartet No. 4 No. 1
 String Quartet No. 4 No. 3
 String Quartet No. 4 No. 6
 String Quartet No. 4 No. 11
 String Quartet No. 4 No. 12
 If
 Why

Personnel

Bruce White, viola
Ian Humphries, violin
Simon Haram, saxophone
Anthony Hinnigan, cello
Ann Morfee, violin
Elizabeth Burley,

2002 albums
Michael Nyman albums